Aurelio Lippo Brandolini (1454? in Florence – 1497 in Rome) was an Italian humanist and political theorist who briefly flourished in the court of the Hungarian king, Matthias Corvinus. He is the author of the treatise Republics and Kingdoms Compared.

Facts

On March 7, 1483, the feast of St. Thomas Aquinas, Brandolini delivered the annual encomium in honor of the "angelic doctor" for the Santa Maria sopra Minerva studium generale, the future Pontifical University of St. Thomas Aquinas, Angelicum.

Brandolini said the funerary oration over Matthias Corvinus.

Brandolini entered the Augustinian order late in life.

Works
Oratio de virtutibus domini nostri Jesu Christi. Romae: ex typographia D. Basae, 1596
F. Aurelii Brandolini Augustiniani cognomento Lippi De ratione scribendi libri tres, in quibus vir ille doctissimus plura etiam, quae a veteribus de arte dicendi tradita sunt...Accessit eiusdem Lippi Oratio laudatissima de Passione Domini.... [Basle]: Per Ioan. Oporinum, et haeredes Ioan Heruagij, 1565. Londini: Apud Henricum Middletonum, 1573
Lippi Brandolini De humanae vitae conditione, et toleranda corporis aegritudine: ...dialogus. Adiecimus alterae huic editioni. De exilaratione animi, in mortis angore Aymari Falconei Thautani dialogum, opuscolum ... Basle: R. Winter, 1543. Parisiis: apud Federicum Morellum ..., 1562
Oratio pro Antonio Lauredano oratore Veneto ad principem et senatum Venetum.

Editions
 James Hankins (ed.), Aurelio Lippo Brandolini, Republics and Kingdoms Compared (Cambridge, Mass.:  Harvard University Press, 2009) (The I Tatti Renaissance Library; 40); *
Review of this edition, with more information

Studies
  E. Rummel, “In Defense of Theologizing Humanists: Aurelio Brandolini’s ‘In sacram Ebreorum historiam … praefatio” in G. Tournoy, ed., Humanistica Lovaniensia 44 (1995): 90-106.

References

1450s births
1497 deaths
15th-century Hungarian people
15th-century Italian writers
Hungarian political philosophers
Hungarian Renaissance humanists
Hungarian people of Italian descent
Italian Renaissance writers
Writers from Florence
Year of birth uncertain
15th-century Latin writers